The Rochester Football Netball Club, nicknamed the Tigers, is an Australian rules football and netball club, formed at a meeting held on 8 June 1874 at Tidy's Restdown Hotel. The club was formed with the purpose of soon "playing and beating Echuca". An intense rivalry that has endured ever since regardless of which competition each was playing in.

Rochester FNC is based in the town of Rochester, Victoria. Its teams currently play in the Goulburn Valley League, where Rochester played for the first time in 1913.

History
The Rochester Football Club was formed in 1874 at Tidy's Rest Down Hotel, Rochester, with a committee elected and players resolved to practice with the intention of beating Echuca.

On 1 June 1877 at Oliver's Cafe the Victorian Football Association was formed, with Rochester FC being one of the foundation clubs.

Between 1874 and 1889 (apart from 1877 in the VFA), there appears to be no evidence that Rochester played in any formal football competitions, but did play some friendly matches against local teams in most years, with regular matches against Echuca.

Rochester played in the Echuca District Football Association against Echuca, Echuca East and Cummeragunja in 1890.

From 1891 to 1893, Rochester played in the Northern District Football Association and in 1892, Rochester won the Aitken Football Premiership Trophy by finishing on top of the ladder, but were disqualified for playing a player without a permit, after a protest from Echuca. A grand final match was then arranged between Rochester and Echuca, but Rochester refused to attend and the premiership was awarded to Echuca.

In 1893, Rochester were runners up to Echuca East for the Lyon & Sons Trophy.

The Rochester Juniors were an official club in 1887 and played against Albion(Sandhurst FC Juniors).

In 1903, Rochester had two teams that played in the Northern Districts Football Association - Rochester Hopetouns and Rochester Federals.

In 1904, Rochester FC did not arrange their AGM until May and by that time there was already two other football club's formed in Rochester - Rochester Imperials and Rochester Federals FC. So the Rochester FC decided to go into recess for the 1904 season. Then in 1905, both Imperials and Federals merged to form one senior club and entered the Campaspe District Football Association.

Rochester FC guernsey's colours in 1906 were blue with a red sash  and played in the Northern District Football Association. In 1906 Rochester's 'new football oval area will measure about 2 3/4 acres, being 7
chains long, 5 broad and 19 in circumference. Outside this, about half a chain. A stout wire rope is to be placed to keen barrackers in their places'.

In 1910, Rochester entered two teams - Ramblers and Rovers into the Football Association, with the Rovers winning the premiership.

Rochester Rovers 3.6 - 24 lost the 1911 Rochester Football Association grand final to Digorra 4.3 - 27.

In 1911, the Rochester DFA played the Bendigo Football League in a match at the Upper Reserve (Queen Elizabeth Oval), with Bendigo: 2.12 - 24 defeating Rochester: 1.6 - 12.

In 1912, the Rochester DFA played the Bendigo Football League in a match at the Upper Reserve (Queen Elizabeth Oval), with the match resulting in a draw, with the scores 6.6 - 42 each.

More than 20 Rochester players joined the war effort in 1915, and some never came home. William Campbell, Cyril Downe, William Edwards, Victor Lamb, Norman Rae, Vincent & Donald McInnes, Patrick Morrissey, Sam Sherlock
all died in World War One.

In 1920, Bamawm: 4.7 - 31 defeated Rochester Imperials: 2.6 - 18 to win the Rochester & District Football Association.

In 1922, Rochester defeated Bamawn in the final, but Bamawn as minor premiers challenged Rochester to a grand final, in which Rochester won.

From 1933 to 1935, there was a Rochester Rovers FC that played in the Echuca District Football League.

A Rochester Football Association was formed in 1938 from the following clubs - Methodists, Naneella, Presbyterians, Rochester and St. Joseph's.

Goulburn Valley FNL
1913 & 1914 and 1973 to 2021
Rochester entered the Goulburn Valley FL for the 1913 season; they were eventually runner-up to Shepparton. The following year, they defeated Echuca in the Grand Final. With the outbreak of World War I, the Goulburn Valley FL did not reform in 1915, so Rochester entered the Bendigo FL.

1990's
The 1990s was a successful period, culminating in six senior grand final berths.

Both seniors and reserves made the grand final in 1990, but both teams lost.

The seniors made the grand final in 1992, defeating Tatura by two points in wet conditions.

They made the grand final again in 1993, but was defeated by Shepparton in controversial circumstances by a kick after the siren.

Rochester participated in a night series Centenary celebration of the GVFL. Rochester won the preliminary games and then defeated Tatura in the final. Anthony McPhee kicked a goal from 40m near the siren to put Rochester 5 points ahead.

In 2008 they beat Seymour for the premiership cup denying Seymour the chance of winning 4 cups in a row.

Bendigo FL
1915, 1923 to 1941, 1946 to 1971
When the Goulburn Valley Football League went into recess in 1915, Rochester joined the Bendigo Football League. In April 1915, Rochester FC ordered 25 black colored guernseys, with a red band, prior to joining the Bendigo Football League. In July 1915, Rochester withdrew from the Bendigo Football League (BFL) due to the pressure of fielding a team each week, due to many young players encouraged to and enlisting in the Australian Army.

After four years in the Rochester District Football Association, playing against Bamawan, Nanneella, Rochester’s two teams, Imperials and Rovers merged and Rochester FC returned to the BFL in 1923. In 1924, Rochester's James Doyle finished second in the goal kicking tally with 61 goals.

In 1923 Rochester won the Minor Premiership in the Bendigo FL, but lost the grand final to Sandhurst, then in 1924, Eaglehawk defeated Rochester in the grand final.

In 1926, Rochester finished sixth on the ladder and collected the wooden spoon, with four wins for the season.

Rochester did not win a game during the 1928 BFL season.

Former South Melbourne player, Bill Berryman was appointed as captain-coach in 1929, at £10 per week  and recorded their first win for the year against Echuca on Saturday, 1 June 1929, recording only two wins for the season.

Former player, W Slattery coached Rochester in 1931.

In 1933, Rochester's Ted Hooper played his 98th consecutive game and was presented with an eight day clock! In early 1934, 24 year old, Ted Hooper played his 100th consecutive game for Rochester, capping it off with three goals.

George Ogilvie coached Echuca from 1930 to 1933, then played with Rochester in 1934, then took over as captain-coach from 1935 to 1937.

In 1940, Rochester commenced playing in the BFL, but in June, the four rural clubs - Echuca East, Kyneton, Maryborough and Rochester were forced out of the competition, due to the expense involved in playing. The four Bendigo based teams remained in the competition.

In late 1956, former Melbourne player, Noel McMahen was appointed as captain-coach for six years at £1,000.00 per season.
Noel McMahen's era as coach was very successful for the Rochester Demons.
In 1957, Rochester made the finals in his first season coaching the club.
In the 1958 Grand Final, Rochester were Premiers defeating Castlemaine, winning their first Premiership in the Bendigo Football League.
In 1959, Rochester were Premiers defeating Kyneton.
In the 1960 Grand Final, Rochester were defeated by Kyneton.
In the 1961 Grand Final, Rochester were defeated by Kyneton.
Noel returned to the city in 1962 to coach South Melbourne for 3 years, however brought South Melbourne to Rochester for a practice preseason game. Ironically, it was this team's only loss for the year!
The 1962 Rochester Demons were Premiers & Champions, defeating Golden Square in the Grand Final.
In 1963, Rochester were Premiers defeating Kyneton, their last Premiership in the Bendigo FL.
In the 1964 Grand Final, Rochester were defeated by Golden Square.
In the 1965 Grand Final, Rochester were defeated by Golden Square.

By 1971, Rochester was being woo-ed by the Goulburn Valley FL, as it was keen to expand, but the Bendigo FL refused a clearance. In 1971, Rochester made the first semi-final played against Echuca at the Queen Elizabeth Oval in the Heart of Bendigo but Rochester wanted the game at their home ground, but the BFL board disagreed, the game went ahead at the QEO and Rochester lost the game to Echuca. The club went into recess for the 1972 season. It commenced with the GVFL in 1973, changing from its red and black colours to black and yellow.

Football competitions timeline
1877 - Victorian Football Association
1890 - Echuca District Football Association
1891 - Northern District Football Association / Sternberg's Football Trophy
1892 - Northern District Football Association / Aitken Football Trophy
1893 - Northern District Football Association / Lyon & Son’s Football Trophy
1894 - Northern District Football Association 
1894 to 1900 - No evidence that Rochester played in any official competitions, but did play some friendly matches against local teams in most years.
1900 & 1901 - Northern District Football Association  / McMaster's (Hotel) Football Trophy 
1902 & 1903 - Northern District Football Association 
1904 - Club in recess. Rochester Federals & Rochester Imperials played in the Campaspe District Football Association in 1904.
1905 - Campaspe District Football Association
1906 - Northern District Football Association
1907 - Campaspe District Football Association - Holmes Trophy
1908 - Echuca District Football Association
1909 - Campaspe Valley District Football Association
1910 & 1911  - Rochester District Football Association
1912 - No formal football competition. Rochester did play several matches against other local towns.
1913 & 1914 - Goulburn Valley Football League
1915 - Bendigo Football League
1916 to 1918 - Club in recess due to World War One
1919 to 1922 - Rochester District Football Association
1923 to 1941 - Bendigo Football League
1942 & 1943 - Club in recess due to World War Two
1944 & 1945 - Campaspe Valley Wartime Football League
1946 to 1971 - Bendigo Football League
1972 - Club in recess
1973 to 2019 - Goulburn Valley Football League
2020 - Club in recess. Covid 19
2021 - Goulburn Valley Football League

Football Premierships
Seniors 

Reserves
Bendigo Football League - 1953, 1958
Goulburn Valley Football League - Nil

Thirds / Under 18's
Goulburn Valley Football League - 1996

Football League Best & Fairest Winners
Seniors
Bendigo Football League: 
Fred Wood Medal
1930 – Len Major  Major played with the Carlton Football Club Reserves in 1931.
1931 – Alf "Digger" Firmer 
1934 – Dave Fraser 
1935 – Ern "Dooley" Major 

T R Davies Medal
1947 – Herb Zegelin 
1950 – Herb Zegelin 

Jack Michelsen Medal
1956 – Frank Fitzpatrick
1957 – Frank Fitzpatrick
1961 – Frank Maxwell
1962 – Ray Willett
1970 – Kevin Shinners

Goulburn Valley Football League: 
Morrison Medal
1988 – Mick Keenan 
1994 – Phillip "Toot" Morgan 
2011 – Guy Campbell 
2015 – Ashley Watson

Reserves
Bendigo Football League
1967 - Jim Sutton
1968 - John Hepworth
Goulburn Valley Football League: Abikhair Medal
1987 - F Lee
2004 - N Whipp
2012 - Brodie Montague

Thirds / Under 18
Bendigo Football League
1960 - Barry Rainbird
Goulburn Valley Football Netball League: Pattison Medal
1976 - B Pearson
1992 - B Speers
2004 - J Spizzica
2009 - Scott Oakley

Most Games
Senior Football
410 - Anthony "Tank" McPhee (a GVFNL record)
302 - Bruce Watson
300+ - Simon McCarty

VFL / AFL Players
The following footballers played for Rochester FC prior to making their VFL / AFL debut & / or drafted to an AFL club.

1912 - Paddy Mills - Carlton. Mills returned to the VFL & played with Carlton on Saturdays & with Rochester on Wednesdays in 1912 & 13.
1914 - Harold Bennett - South Melbourne 
1920 - Kevin Duffy - St. Kilda
1922 - Rowley Watt - Essendon
1924 - Gerry Beare - Richmond
1925 - Basil McCormack - Richmond
1927 - Bruce Curruthers - Essendon
1929 - Bill Lever - Carlton
1930 - Ron Martin - South Melbourne
1932 - Leslie Watt - Collingwood
1937 - Hugh Murnane - Melbourne
1938 - Chris Lamborn - North Melbourne
1938 - Peter Paterson - Essendon
1939 - Charlie Van Der Bist - Hawthorn
1940 - Kevin Barrett - Collingwood
1940 - Adrian Dullard - Melbourne
1944 - Des Nisbet - St. Kilda
1945 - Bruce Edge - Melbourne 
1952 - Allen Rodgers - Footscray
1957 - Geoff Dupuy - Hawthorn
1958 - Frank Fitzpatrick - Geelong
1962 - Ken Colvin - South Melbourne
1965 - John Williams - Essendon
1983 - David Williams - Melbourne
1988 - Simon McCarty - North Melbourne. 1988 - VFL Draft, No. 46
1990 - Glyn Tomlinson - Geelong. 1990 - AFL Draft, No. 43
1992 - Matthew Febey - Melbourne
2017 - Joe Atley - Port Adelaide

The following footballers played VFL / AFL football prior to making their debut with the Rochester FC. The year indicates their debut season at Rochester.
 
1911 - Paddy Mills - Melbourne
1924 - Clyde Smith - Collingwood
1927 - Rex De Garis - St. Kilda
1929 - Bill Berryman - South Melbourne
1930 - Danny Warr - St. Kilda
1934 - George Ogilvie Junior - Richmond 
1949 - Harry Hickey - Footscray 
1953 - Noel Jarvis - Fitzroy
1955 - Roy Files - North Melbourne
1955 - Jim Wilson - Melbourne
1957 - Noel McMahen - Melbourne 
1958 - Les Pridham - Essendon
1959 - Geoff Barber - Essendon
1961 - Con O'Toole - Melbourne
1962 - Ray Willett - Collingwood 
1964 - Trevor Randall - Hawthorn
1968 - Don Keyter - South Melbourne
1970 - Kevin Shinners - Richmond
1979 - Geoff Rosenow - Geelong
1992 - Jamie Duursma - Melbourne

Club Honourboard

References

External links
 Rochester FNC Twitter page
 Rochester FNC Facebook page
 Rochester FNC SportsTG site
 Rochester FNC Team App
 Goulburn Valley Football Netball League
 Bendigo Football Netball League
 1908 - Campaspe Valley Football Association Premiers: Rochester Juniors FC team photo
 1914 - Goulburn Valley Football League Premiers: Rochester FC team photo
 1915 - Football photos at Rochester
 1930 - Rochester FC & Sandhurst FC team photos
 1932 - Eaglehawk FC & Rochester FC team photos
 1949 - Bendigo Football League, defeated Preliminary Finalist team - Rochester FC team photo
 1952 - Football Club ball photos at Rochester
 1952 - Boort Football Carnival: Rochester FC team photo
 1962 - Bendigo Football League Premiers: Rochester FC team photo

1874 establishments in Australia
Sports clubs established in 1874
Australian rules football clubs established in 1874
Bendigo Football League clubs
Goulburn Valley Football League clubs
Netball teams in Victoria (Australia)